Alpheus rapacida, is a species of snapping shrimp of the family Alpheidae.

References

External links
 

Alpheidae
Crustaceans described in 1908
Taxa named by Johannes Govertus de Man